Reynaudia is a genus of plants in the grass family. The only known species is Reynaudia filiformis, native to the Greater Antilles (Cuba, Jamaica, and Hispaniola).

References

Panicoideae
Monotypic Poaceae genera
Flora of the Caribbean